Evgenia Medvedeva (alternative transliteration from Russian: Yevgeniya Medvedeva)  may refer to:

 Evgenia Medvedeva, Russian figure skater
 Yevgeniya Medvedeva (cross-country skier), Russian cross-country skier